Hong Kah is a residential precinct in Jurong West, Singapore. It is bounded by the PIE, Corporation Road, Jurong Canal Drive, Jurong East Avenue 1 and Jurong Town Hall Road. It is named after the former 'Hong Kah Village'.

The precinct's HDB flats are under the management of Jurong-Clementi Town Council and the residents are represented in parliament by either Shawn Huang Wei Zhong or Xie Yao Quan, depending on where they stay.

History
Hong Kah is named after the former Hong Kah Village which used to exist north of the present site.

Housing

Public

Private
Lake Grande
Lakeville
Parc Vista
The Lakeshore

Transportation

Roads
The main roads in Hong Kah are Jurong West Avenue 2, Corporation Road, Boon Lay Way, Jurong Town Hall Road, Jurong East Avenue 1 and Jurong West Avenue 1, which connects the precinct to the rest of the island through the PIE exits 31 and 34, to the Bukit Batok Road and Jurong West Avenue 2 with minor roads (Jurong West Street 41/42/51/52 and Jurong East Street 32) winding through the various estates in the precinct.

The LTA plans to extend the Jurong Canal Drive to Boon Lay Way and from the PIE to Brickland Road as the infrastructure cannot cope with the Tengah New Town.

Public transport

Feeder bus services
Hong Kah is linked to Jurong East MRT station through feeder services 333, 334 and 335 and 335 is extensively available towards Chinese Garden MRT station.

Trunk bus Services
There are several trunk services that plies through Hong Kah area. Service 49 is extensively available towards Lakeside MRT station.

Special bus Services
Bus connection to the city is available through premium service 542, City Direct service 657 and express service 502.

Schools
There are 3 primary schools (Rulang, Shuqun and Jurong), 6 secondary schools (Fuhua, Yuhua, Hua Yi, Hong Kah and Jurongville), 1 tertiary school (Jurong Junior College), 1 special-needs school (Grace Orchard School), 1 international school (Canadian International School) and many pre-school centres in Hong Kah.

Recreation
There are 3 neighbourhood parks in Hong Kah, each located at Jurong West Street 41, Jurong West Street 42 and Jurong East Street 32. Though illegal, fishing activities can be carried out at the canal in the precinct, located at the junction of Jurong West Avenue 1 and Jurong West Avenue 1. The nearest sports complex is Jurong East Sports and Recreation Centre, accessible from the rest of the precinct through all the bus services (except 335) that pass through this precinct.

Community Centres
There are 2 community centres in the precinct, with Jurong Spring Community Club located in Hong Kah South (Jurong Spring) and Jurong Green Community Club located in Hong Kah East (Jurong Central). Apart from the courses in the community centres, there are playing courts there that can be used for free.

Town Centres
Hong Kah Point is the town centre of Hong Kah, located at the junction of Jurong West Avenue 1 and Jurong West Street 52, accessible by all the bus services that ply through the precinct. 

The town centre boasts the 'Jurong West Street 52 Market and Food Centre', which was built in 1985 and was the latest hawker centre in Singapore to be built over the past 20 years, before the next hawker centre opened in Bukit Panjang. Apart from the hawker centre, the shops in this town centre provides Postal, banking, dining, baking, dental, medical, D.I.Y, education and fashion services to meet the daily needs of the residents. The town council office and HDB service centre are also located here.

Places of Worship
There are 4 Chinese Temples in Hong Kah,
Che Wein Khor Temple (紫盈阁), belonged to Church of Virtue, Jurong West Ave 1
Jurong West United Temple (裕廊西联合宫), Jurong West Street 41
Jurong Combined Temple (裕廊总宫), Jurong West Street 42
Tong Whye Temple (通淮庙), dedicated to Lord Guan, Jurong East Street 32
The nearest Churches and Mosque are located in Taman Jurong and Yuhua.

Healthcare
Apart from the many medical clinics in the precinct, there are 2 medical institutions in the precinct, located at Jurong West Avenue 1 and Jurong East Avenue 1 providing more advance medical services.
Jurong Polyclinic provides medical services to the general public.
Choice Retreat Home provides medical services to the elderly patients.

Security
The Jurong West Neighbourhood Police Centre is located in Hong Kah at the junction of Jurong West Avenue 1 and Corporation Road.

See also
Monkey tree phenomenon

References

External links
Jurong-Clementi Town Council
Jurong GRC

Places in Singapore
Jurong West